Domremy-la-Canne is a commune in the Meuse department in Grand Est in north-eastern France.

It is a small village of 35 inhabitants (2018). Located at 240 metres altitude, Domremy-la-Canne extends 3 km ². The mayor appoints Jean-Paul Henry.

Geography
The village lies in the middle of the commune, on the right bank of the Othain, which flows northwestward through the commune.

See also
Communes of the Meuse department

References

Domremylacanne